Live Live Live Extra is a live album released by X Japan on November 5, 1997. Supplemental to the previously published Live Live Live Tokyo Dome 1993-1996, it contains more recordings from the band's annual New Year's Eve concerts at the Tokyo Dome. All tracks on this album were recorded on December 31, 1996, with the exception of "Piano Solo", which was taken from the 1995 performance. The album reached number 13 on the Oricon chart.

Track listing

References 

X Japan live albums
1997 live albums
Albums recorded at the Tokyo Dome